Sabalom Glitz is a fictional character from the long-running British science fiction television series, Doctor Who.  Glitz is a rogue from the planet Salostophus in the Andromeda Constellation.  Glitz's first love is money, and he is often engaged in mercenary acts and profiteering.  The character was created by writer Robert Holmes.

Character history
The Sixth Doctor and Peri Brown encounter Glitz and his fellow mercenary Dibber on the planet Ravalox (The Mysterious Planet). Ravalox is really Earth around 2,000,000 AD, having been moved two light years by the Time Lords. Glitz and Dibber are on Ravalox looking for secrets stolen by the Sleepers of Andromeda from the Matrix on Gallifrey. The secrets are guarded by an L-3 robot named Drathro. Glitz plans to destroy the Black Light system that fuels Drathro and then steal the secrets. When Dibber destroys the external collection aerial, the system becomes dangerously unstable, and only the Doctor's intervention prevents a potentially catastrophic explosion.

Nearing the end of the Doctor's trial, Glitz is summoned to the Gallifreyan space station by his business partner — the Master. The Master reveals that the events on Ravalox were engineered by the Time Lords to cover up the theft of the secrets. As the trial dissolves into chaos, Glitz accompanies the Doctor into the fictional reality of the Matrix to fight the Valeyard. The Master bribes Glitz to betray the Doctor, but in turn is tricked by the Valeyard. Given what he thinks are the true secrets of the Matrix, the Master tries to upload them into his TARDIS's systems, causing the Master and Glitz to be paralysed within the TARDIS. After the Doctor finally defeats the Valeyard, he requests that the Time Lords show leniency to Glitz.

The Doctor, having since regenerated into his seventh persona, next encounters Glitz on Iceworld on the planet Svartos (Dragonfire), where Glitz has become indebted to the power-mad Kane as a result of a failed fraud and gambling losses. After hearing about a fabulous treasure known as the Dragonfire, Glitz accompanies the Seventh Doctor, Ace and Melanie Bush in their search, hoping to keep it for himself. He doesn't realize that Kane has installed a tracking device on the map. The Dragonfire turns out to be part of a large bio-mechanoid dragon, which in turn is revealed to be Kane's jailer on the planet Svartos.  After the bio-mechanoid is destroyed, Kane uses the Dragonfire to power the Iceworld systems intending to escape.  He also has his mercenaries drive the occupants of Iceworld onto Glitz's ship, the Nosferatu, which he subsequently destroys.  Eager for revenge, Glitz goes to find Kane, and meets The Doctor, Ace and Mel in the control room of Iceworld. Iceworld is revealed to be a massive spaceship, with which Kane intends to make his escape and seek revenge on his home planet from which he was banished three thousand years earlier. However, with the systems now fully powered, the Doctor uses Iceworld's star charts to reveal to Kane that his homeworld had been destroyed when its sun went supernova two thousand years earlier. Kane then kills himself with unfiltered sunlight, and Glitz steals the ship, which he renames Nosferatu II. To the Doctor's surprise, Mel elects to leave the TARDIS and travel with Glitz.

Production notes
The original outline by Ian Briggs for the Seventh Doctor serial The Curse of Fenric made a reference to Ace not being a virgin, but this was removed for the final production. Briggs, who had created the character of Ace, had stated in Ace's character outline for Dragonfire that she had slept with Glitz on Iceworld.  The Paul Cornell-written New Adventures novel Love and War implies (and his later novel Happy Endings confirms) that Ace lost her virginity to Glitz. In the commentary track for Dragonfire. Sophie Aldred (who portrayed Ace) was surprised to learn that there was ever supposed to be a romantic relationship between her character and Glitz and remarked that she wasn't sure such an idea made sense.

Other appearances
Glitz also appears in the Past Doctor Adventures novel Mission: Impractical by David A. McIntee. The Sixth Doctor and Frobisher run into Glitz and Dibber as they attempt to pull off the crime of the century on Vandor Prime. Dibber is killed in the adventure, and this explains why he wasn't on Iceworld. Glitz makes a brief appearance in the Missing Adventures novel Goth Opera when past companion Romana materialises on his ship by chance when a renegade Time Lady tries to get rid of her, although Romana is rescued a few hours later. In the New Adventures novel, Head Games, it is revealed that Glitz tired of Mel and left her on the decrepit leisure world Avalone. She was left here for months until saved by Jason and the fictional Dr Who.

References

Glitz
Glitz, Sabalom
Fictional criminals
Male characters in television